Day of Tankmen is a professional military holiday in Russia and the former Soviet Union, celebrated every second Sunday of September. It celebrates the service and sacrifices of tank crews and commanders in armored formations since the Russian Civil War, when tanks were first used in Russian territory.

History of the holiday

Background 
The holiday was established in the USSR by a decree of the Presidium of the Supreme Soviet on 11 July 1946 to commemorate the role of the mechanized and armored forces in the Red Army in defeating their enemy counterparts from the Wehrmacht during the Great Patriotic War. It was, from 1946 to 1980, celebrated on 11 September, which honors the East Carpathian Strategic Offensive.

Cold War era 
On the first celebration that year, a military parade of armored equipment was held on Red Square in the presence of the military leadership on Lenin's Mausoleum and spectators from the adjacent stands, with the personnel being drawn from the 4th Guards Tank Division to participate in the 3-hour parade. Its troops were concentrated on Gorky Street (now Tverskaya Street) from Okhotny Ryad to Mayakovsky Square. After the parade, it was discovered that St. Basil's Cathedral was damaged due to strong, though minor, vibration.

In the 40s and 50s, celebrations included columns of tanks being driven on streets in major Soviet cities watched by enthusiastic crowds.

Official status and modern celebrations 
In 1980, a decree by the Supreme Soviet gave a new procedure for the celebration was established. The procedure required that the holiday not have a fixed date and it should be celebrated on the second Sunday of September from that year onwards. In 2006, it was re-approved by President Vladimir Putin. It has been celebrated on that day ever since as a day of celebration for the servicemen of armored units. It is one of the most revered holidays in the Russian Ground Forces today. It is still celebrated outside of Russia by the Belarusian Ground Forces and the Ukrainian Ground Forces (with Ukrainian specifications). Ukraine has marked it on 9 September since 29 August 1997 when with was created by the decree of President Leonid Kuchma.

See also 
 Border Guards Day
 Navy Day
 Paratroopers' Day

References 

September observances
Military of the Soviet Union
Military of Russia
Military of Ukraine
Military of Belarus
Public holidays in the Soviet Union
Observances in Russia
Observances in Ukraine
Observances in Belarus